Earthwords and Music is John Hartford's second LP, released in 1967. Like all of his RCA recordings, it was reissued in 2002 as part of a "twofer" CD, combined with his first album, Looks at Life.

The album includes Hartford's Grammy-winning hit song, "Gentle on My Mind".

Reception

After noting some of the musical novelty songs of the album, music critic Jim Worbois, writing for Allmusic, wrote "Also contains some fine straight songs. Good stuff."

Track listing
All songs by John Hartford.
"Good Old Electric Washing Machine" – 2:08
"Love Song in 2/4 Time" – 1:38
"Daytime of Life" – 5:22
"Whose That?" – 1:52
"There Are No Fools in Heaven" – 4:30
"Earthwords" – 1:43
"Gentle on My Mind" – 3:05
"Naked in Spite of Myself" – 3:09
"How Come You're Being So Good to Me" – 2:05
"No End of Love" – 3:21
"Left Handed Woman" – 1:39
"Baking Soda" – 1:28

References

1967 albums
John Hartford albums
RCA Victor albums
Albums produced by Felton Jarvis